The Tobolsk electoral district was a constituency created for the 1917 Russian Constituent Assembly election.

The electoral district covered the Tobolsk Governorate. Tobolsk hosted one of only 2 undivided Social Democratic lists in the fray across the country. Soviet sources indicated that the Social Democratic list was Menshevik-dominated. In September 1917, the Bolshevik Party in Omsk sent a small soldiers and railway workers to campaign amongst the peasantry in Tobolsk Governorate ahead of the elections.

Soviet sources reported voter turnout at a mere 33.5%.

Results

References

Electoral districts of the Russian Constituent Assembly election, 1917